Bahun Bhanjyang is located in Gandakī Pradesh, Western Region, Nepal. It is in the superior administrative division of Tanahun District.

References

Populated places in Tanahun District
Tanahun District